Phyllis Henderson (born November 14, 1959) is an American politician. She was a member of the South Carolina House of Representatives from the 21st District, serving from 2010 until 2018. She is a member of the Republican party.

References

Living people
1959 births
Republican Party members of the South Carolina House of Representatives
21st-century American politicians

Women state legislators in South Carolina